Wen Yimin (文逸民 : Beijing, 1890 – Hong Kong, 22 December 1978) was a Chinese film director and actor. After 1959 he turned back to acting, with roles in numerous Hong Kong films until 1971.

Filmography
As director, around 50 films
Heroic Son and Daughter (1927) for Youlian (U. Lien) Film Company Shanghai, co-starring with future wife Fan Xuepeng
followed by four more sequels in the swordsman genre for Youlian
Red Heroine (1929), available with English subtitles at the Chinese Film Classics website
Shattered Dream in the Dance Hall Tianyi studio, starring Fan Xuepeng
Mother  
As actor, at least 56 films

References

1890 births
1978 deaths
Chinese silent film directors
Chinese emigrants to British Hong Kong